Guadalupe District is one of five districts of the province Pacasmayo in Peru.

Localities
Some localities in Guadalupe district are the following:
Ciudad de Dios
Limoncarro
Faclo

References